Kuhrang County is in Chaharmahal and Bakhtiari province, Iran. The capital of the county is the city of Chelgerd. At the 2006 census, the county's population was 33,468 in 5,980 households. The following census in 2011 counted 35,915 people in 7,702 households. At the 2016 census, the county's population was 41,535 in 10,859 households.

Kuhrang County has many tourist attractions based on its environmental diversity, such as Kuhrang Spring, ice caves, Sheikh Ali Khan waterfall, and Dimeh Spring. The people of this county are Bakhtiari and speak Lorish.

The county is the site three dams and tunnels transferring water from the Kuhrang River to the Zayandeh River: Kouhrang 1, Kouhrang 2, and Kouhrang 3

Administrative divisions

The population history and structural changes of Kuhrang County's administrative divisions over three consecutive censuses are shown in the following table. The latest census shows three districts, seven rural districts, and three cities.

References

 

Counties of Chaharmahal and Bakhtiari Province